Comblain-au-Pont is a municipality of Wallonia located in the province of Liège, Belgium. 

As of 1 January 2014 Comblain-au-Pont had a total population of 6,754. The total area is 22.68 km² which gives a population density of 237 inhabitants per km². It is situated at the confluence of the rivers Amblève and Ourthe.

The municipality consists of the following districts: Comblain-au-Pont and Poulseur.

See also
 List of protected heritage sites in Comblain-au-Pont

References

External links
 

 
Municipalities of Liège Province
Segni (tribe)